Running Wild is a 1955 American film noir crime film directed by Abner Biberman and starring William Campbell, Mamie Van Doren, Keenan Wynn, and Kathleen Case. The film was often paired with Tarantula as part of a double feature.

Plot
Ralph Barton is a young rookie cop who goes undercover to infiltrate an auto-theft ring run by juvenile delinquents.

Cast
 William Campbell as Ralph Barton
 Mamie Van Doren as Irma Bean
 Keenan Wynn as Ken Osanger
 Kathleen Case as Leta Novak
 Jan Merlin as Scotty Cluett
 John Saxon as Vince Pomeroy
 Walter Coy as Lieutenant Ed Newpole
 Grayce Mills as Osanger's Mother (as Grace Mills)
 Chris Randall Arkie Nodecker
 Michael Fox as Delmar Graves
 Will J. White as State Trooper 
 Richard Castle as Herbie
 Otto Waldis as Leta's Father

Production
It was the first significant role for John Saxon, put under contract to Universal.

Reception
Variety called it "okay".

See also
List of American films of 1955

References

External links
 
 
 

1955 films
Film noir
1955 crime drama films
American crime drama films
Films based on American novels
Films directed by Abner Biberman
1950s English-language films
1950s American films
American black-and-white films